Adam Air Flight 172 refers to an accident suffered by a Boeing 737-300, when it landed in Surabaya at the end of a scheduled domestic passenger flight from Soekarno–Hatta International Airport to Juanda Airport. On 21 February 2007, the plane bent on landing, with the fuselage cracking in the middle of the passenger section. All six of Adam Air's remaining 737s were immediately grounded, and five of them were back in regular service later that year. This incident caused further concerns regarding the safety of flights operated by Adam Air, which had received much criticism after the 1 January 2007 crash of Flight 574.

Aircraft
The aircraft, a Boeing 737-33A, registration PK-KKV, was acquired by Adam Air in December 2006, having previously been operated by Brazilian operator Varig. The aircraft was manufactured in 1994.

Accident
The plane bent upon landing at Juanda International Airport, with the fuselage breaking in the middle of the passenger section. The landing was particularly hard, with baggage being ejected from cabin lockers into the cabin space. The tail section of the plane was bent down compared to the rest of the plane. Subsequent flights to the airport were diverted to alternate airports. Adam Air's fleet of Boeing 737-300s were grounded for safety inspections in the interim. Immediately after the accident, Adam Air repainted the aircraft, covering the original orange livery with a plain white exterior. This is legally permissible, so long as no evidence is destroyed. Also in the immediate aftermath, a large number of passengers cancelled their flights with Adam Air, saying they had "lost faith" in the airline. They were all refunded in full.

Grounding of Adam Air's 737s

As a result of the incident, all six remaining Adam Air 737s were immediately grounded awaiting safety checks. Vice-President of Indonesia, Jusuf Kalla, said that all Boeing 737-300s should be checked. He eventually decided the entire Indonesian fleet of 737s should be checked, but did not ground any more aircraft. There were also suggestions that Adam Air should be suspended from all operations until the entire fleet could be checked, with MP Abdul Hakim saying "It will be good for the company and the government ... until the flight authorities can determine if Adam Air is still worthy as national aircraft company".

The Indonesian Transport Ministry said that if the aircraft showed signs of problems, the checks would be expanded to cover all 737s operating in Indonesia. On 5 March, it was reported that five of the six aircraft had returned to normal operations, but the sixth was still undergoing a full maintenance overhaul at maintenance, repair and overhaul firm, GMF AeroAsia facility. Adam Air had resumed its normal schedule by 9 March 2007.

Investigation
The accident was investigated by the National Transportation Safety Committee (NTSC). Investigators compiled data from the Indonesian weather agency and from the air traffic control center in Surabaya in an attempt to determine the cause. Officials state the aircraft did pass safety checks prior to its departure.  Boeing announced that they would also provide technical assistance to both the authorities and the airline during the course of the investigation.

The final report from the NTSC stated that the probable cause of the accident was an excessive sink rate upon touchdown, following an unstabilised approach. In the report, the NTSC noted that the approach was unstable below , with a vertical speed occasionally greater than 2500 ft/min (13 m/s). The vertical acceleration on landing was measured at 5 g. Additionally, the aircraft initially touched down with the right main gear approximately  outside of the runway edge.

The investigation further revealed that there was no technical malfunction on the aircraft prior to touchdown.

The flight crew was criticized for not maintaining a sterile cockpit during the landing, with excessive non-flight related discussion going on throughout the flight.

Unusual for an aircraft accident investigation, the investigative committee was not provided information as to the identities of the aircraft flight crew.

Safety concerns

The safety record of Adam Air was heavily criticised, especially in the aftermath of Flight 574. Pilots reported repeated and deliberate breaches of international safety regulations, with aircraft being flown in non-airworthy states for months at a time. They claimed that there had been such incidents as requests to sign documents to allow an aircraft to fly while not having the authority to and while knowing the plane to be not airworthy, flying a plane for several months with a damaged door handle, swapping parts between aircraft to avoid mandatory replacement deadlines, being ordered to fly aircraft after exceeding the take-off limit of five times per pilot per day, flying an aircraft with a damaged window, using spare parts from other aircraft to keep planes in the air, and the ignoring of pilots' requests not to take off due to unsafe aircraft. The Associated Press quoted one pilot as saying that "Every time you flew, you had to fight with the ground staff and the management about all the regulations you had to violate." They also claim that if pilots confronted their seniors in the airline, they were grounded or docked pay.

Aftermath
The Indonesian government announced plans immediately after the accident to ban jets over ten years of age for any commercial purpose. The age limit had been 35 years or 70,000 landings. Among those to be replaced were the directors of air and sea transports and the chairman of the National Committee for Transportation Safety. Indonesia also intended to introduce a new system of ranking airlines according to their safety record, with a level one ranking meaning the airline has no serious issues, a level two ranking meaning the airline must fix problems, and a level three rating forcing the airline to be shut down.

See also

Ground effect (aerodynamics)
List of accidents and incidents involving commercial aircraft

References

External links
 Final report (Archive) – National Transportation Safety Committee

2007 in Indonesia
Aviation accidents and incidents in Indonesia
Aviation accidents and incidents in 2007
Accidents and incidents involving the Boeing 737 Classic
February 2007 events in Asia
 Adam Air accidents and incidents